Davide De Marino (born 17 March 2000) is an Italian professional footballer who plays as a defender for  club Virtus Francavilla, on loan from  club Juventus.

Career

Pro Vercelli 
De Marino joined Pro Vercelli's youth team in 2016, making his senior debut on 18 May 2018, during the 2017–18 Serie B season, against Cittadella in a 2–0 away defeat. The following season, De Marino played six games in the Serie C, before being ruled out for almost two years due to two ACL injuries. He returned on 27 September 2020, during the 2020–21 Serie C season, in a 1–0 home win against Novara. De Marino finished the season with 15 league games.

Juventus U23 
On 16 January 2021, De Marino joined Serie C side Juventus U23 – the reserve team of Juventus – on a permanent deal. He made his debut the following day, playing as a starter in a 1–1 draw at home to Piacenza. De Marino was called up to the first-team squad on 6 March by coach Andrea Pirlo, for a home match against Lazio. On 25 April, De Marino suffered a third ACL injury. His first call up after recovery came on 4 December, for a match against Renate set to be played the following day.

Loans to Pisa, Pescara and Virtus Francavilla
On 31 January 2022, De Marino joined Pisa on loan with an option to buy. De Marino made 12 bench appearances without seeing the field. On 14 July 2022, De Marino was loaned to Pescara. He made three late substitute appearances for Pescara in league games and started twice in Coppa Italia Serie C. On 11 January 2023, he moved on a new loan to Virtus Francavilla.

Career statistics

Club

References

External links 
 
 

2000 births
Living people
People from Savigliano
Sportspeople from the Province of Cuneo
Footballers from Piedmont
Italian footballers
Association football defenders
F.C. Pro Vercelli 1892
Juventus Next Gen players
Juventus F.C. players
Pisa S.C. players
Delfino Pescara 1936 players
Virtus Francavilla Calcio players
Serie B players
Serie C players